The Roewe 950 is a large four door saloon that is produced by Roewe in China, and is based on the 2010 Buick LaCrosse. It was first shown to the public at the 2012 Beijing International Motor Show, and commenced production in April 2012.

Overview
The strong relationship between the 950 and Buick LaCrosse is a result of the SAIC-GM-Wuling joint venture, with Roewe owned by SAIC Motor. The 950 is powered by a range of General Motors engines. The four cylinder 2.0 litre produces  @ 6,200 rpm and  @ 4,600, the four cylinder 2.4 litre produces  @ 6,200 rpm and  @ 4,800 rpm. 

The only transmission option is a six speed automatic. 

2017 facelift
In July 2017, a major facelift was conducted on the 950, and the front view was updated to look in line with the later Roewe vehicles influenced by the Roewe Vision-R electric concept car. The rear view was also updated with new LED tail lamps and a horizontal chrome bar above the license plate.

950 Fuel Cell
The 950 plug-in hybrid fuel cell was unveiled at the 2014 Beijing Auto Show.

The 950 Fuel Cell become the first Chinese production fuel cell passenger vehicle when production commenced in 2016. As of October 2019, a 50 vehicle demonstration fleet had been produced for leasing and for the United Nations Development Programme (UNDP) demonstration. The fleet had travelled more than 500,000 kilometers. The 950 Fuel Cell was not offered to the public.

e950
The e950 plug-in hybrid was unveiled in November 2015 at the Guangzhou Auto Show and was launched in April 2016 at the 2016 Beijing Auto Show. The e950 has a two speed automatic gearbox.

In 2017, a e950 '2017 facelift' was released.

Gallery

See also
List of fuel cell vehicles

References

External links
 

950
2010s cars
Cars introduced in 2012
Plug-in hybrid vehicles
Executive cars
Cars of China